Epicyon ("more than a dog") is a large, extinct, canid genus of the subfamily Borophaginae ("bone-crushing dogs"), native to North America. Epicyon is the largest known canid of all time, with the type species reaching 2.4 m (7.9 ft) in length, 90 cm (35 in) in shoulder height and approximately 100–125 kg (220–276 lb) in body mass.

Description
Epicyon had a massive head and powerful jaws that were well adapted for bone-crushing, with enlarged fourth premolars like some hyenas, giving its skull a lion-like shape rather than having a skull similar in shape to that of a wolf; the adaptation would have allowed Epicyon to scavenge as well as hunt, giving it access to the nutritious marrow other contemporary carnivores couldn't access.

Epicyon was one of the last of the borophagines, and shared its North American habitat with several other canids, including: 
 Borophagus  (Mya)
 Carpocyon from 20.4 to 
 Paratomarctus from 16.3 to 
 Aelurodon from 16.0 to 
 Canis lepophagus from 10.3 to

Species 
Fossil specimens range from Florida to California and have been found in Nebraska, Montana, Kansas, Texas, New Mexico, Colorado, Oklahoma, Idaho, Oregon, Arizona within the United States. As well as in Alberta, Canada.

Epicyon haydeni, the type species, existed from 20.6-5.3 million years ago. It is synonymous with Aelurodon aphobus, Osteoborus ricardoensis, Osteoborus validus, and Tephrocyon mortifer, and was named by Joseph Leidy as a subgenus. It was recombined as Aelurodon haydeni by Scott and Osborn in 1890. Further study by Matthew in 1899, Matthew and Gidley in 1904, VanderHoof and Gregory in 1940, McGrew in 1944, Bennett in 1979, (1979) and Becker (1980). It again was recombined as Epicyon haydeni by Baskin in 1980, Voorhies in 1990, (1990), Baskin (1998), Wang et al. in 1999.

The molars of Epicoyn haydeni were grindstone-like teeth that allow for a canid diet that includes both meat and plant and insects. The proportional size of an animal's molars is a great measure of the nutritional diversity of its diet. Based on fossilized feces and its robust teeth and jaw muscles it is believed to have consumed large amounts of bone and share a similar digestive tract to modern day hyenas due to their ability to break down bones. They are also believed to be social hunters since Epicyon haydeni is very prevalent in the fossil record as one of the most common meat-eaters in North America during the late Miocene Epoch period. The deadly bite of a Epicyon haydeni was delivered by the canine teeth, which are placed near the front of the upper and lower jaws, the shortening of the jaws can be an effective method for getting the canines closer to the mandibular condyle, thereby increasing the biting force.

Epicyon haydeni's small clavicle, flexible back, and digitigrade posture are all postcranial features shared with other canids and are likely adaptations designed to increase the animal's stride length. It seems from examinations of the limb proportions and toughness of the skeleton that Epicyon haydeni was less cursorial than hyaenas or modern wolves but more cursorial than other borophagine species like Aelurodon. Unlike hyenas, Epicyon haydeni must have used their rearmost lower premolar (p4) and upper carnassial (P4) to crack large bones (ibid.). Smaller bones and bone fragments were likely crushed with the carnassials and postcarnassial molars just as in extant canids. Due to its bigger size and heavier, less gracile skeleton, Epicyon haydeni was less cursorial and unable to run as long a distance as Epicyon saevus. Instead it relied on bursts of speed and social hunting strategies.

Epicyon saevus existed from 16.3-4.9 million years ago. It is synonymous with Aelurodon inflatus and was named by Joseph Leidy in 1858 or 1859. In the late 1880s-early 1900s, Scott, Matthew, Cope and Matthew, Troxell recombined the animal as Aelurodon saevus. It was recombined as Epicyon saevus by Baskin in 1980, Munthe in 1989, Voorhies in 1990, and Wang et al. 1999.

Epicyon aelurodontoides existed from 10.3-4.9 million years ago. It was named by X. Wang and others in 1999. It was found south of the Young Brothers Ranch, Kansas.

Taxonomy
Epicyon was first named by Joseph Leidy in 1858 as a subgenus of Canis. It was also mentioned as belonging to the Aelurodontina by Matthew and Stirton in 1930. Later studies indicates that it was not a species of Canis, but a borophagine.

Paleoecology
In North America, in places such as Coffee Ranch in Texas, Epicyon shared territory with the bear Agriotherium and the feliform Barbourofelis, machairodont cat Amphimachairodus coloradensis, and fellow canid Borophagus. All of these animals were potential competitors that would have occasionally conflicted with Epicyon for food and territory. Prey for Epicyon included herbivores such as the camel Aepycamelus, the pronghorn Cosoryx, horses such as Neohipparion and Nannippus, the peccary Prosthennops, and the rhinoceroses such as Teleoceras, all of which could provide a suitable meal through hunting or scavenging.

References

Alan Turner, "National Geographic: Prehistoric Mammals" (Washington, D.C.: Firecrest Books Ltd., 2004), pp. 112–114.

General references
Xiaoming Wang, Richard H. Tedford, Mauricio Antón, Dogs: Their Fossil Relatives and Evolutionary History, New York : Columbia University Press, 2008; 

Borophagines
Miocene canids
Miocene mammals of North America
Prehistoric carnivoran genera
Fossil taxa described in 1858